Bachir Boudjelid (born 23 December 1978) is an Algerian former professional footballer who played as a forward.

Club career
 1997–1999 JS Bordj Ménaïel
 1999–2001 JS Kabylie
 2001–2003 IRB Khemis El Khechna
 2003–2005 US Chaouia
 2005–2008 CA Bordj Bou Arreridj
 2008–? JS Kabylie

Honours
JS Kabylie
 CAF Cup: 2000

References

1978 births
Living people
People from Bordj Menaïel
People from Bordj Menaïel District
People from Boumerdès Province
Kabyle people
Algerian footballers
Association football forwards
JS Kabylie players
CA Bordj Bou Arréridj players
MO Constantine players
US Chaouia players
JS Bordj Ménaïel players
21st-century Algerian people